Saratoga Park is a public park in Bedford–Stuyvesant, Brooklyn. It is bordered by Halsey Street, Saratoga Avenue, Macon Street, and Howard Avenue.

History 
Prior to becoming a park the land was used to host travelling circuses. In 1896 it was purchased by the City of Brooklyn to convert into a park. After the park was created, the circus and event field moved just east across Saratoga Avenue and continued operating until 1912.

War Memorial 
In 1920 local Citizen's Memorial Committees commissioned a memorial to honor those from the neighborhood who lost their lives in World War I. The monument was dedicated on September 11, 1921. The memorial consisted of two scrolls listing the 104 men who died in the war, and, notably, the first woman Marine buried with full military honors. Between the scrolls stood a bronze figure of Columbia sculpted by James Novelli and cast by Roman Bronze Works.

In the late 20th century the monument fell into disrepair with the plaques stolen in 1970. 30 years later in 2000 the main statue was stolen. The investigation that followed retrieved pieces of the statue from a scrapyard. 

After the pedestal stood empty for more than ten years, discretionary funding was allocated by Councilmember Darlene Mealy to recreate the monument from archival photos and the recovered pieces of the original monument. On September 10, 2014 the monument was rededicated at a ceremony attended by Mealy and Eric Adams.

References 

1896 establishments in New York City
Protected areas established in 1896
Urban public parks
Parks in Brooklyn
Bedford–Stuyvesant, Brooklyn